Francisco Pelayo Covarrubias (born 8 November 1969) is a Mexican politician affiliated with the PAN. He currently serves as Deputy of the LXII Legislature of the Mexican Congress representing Baja California Sur. He also served as municipal president of Comondú.

References

1969 births
Living people
Politicians from Baja California Sur
National Action Party (Mexico) politicians
21st-century Mexican politicians
People from Comondú Municipality
Universidad del Valle de Atemajac alumni
Municipal presidents in Baja California Sur
Members of the Chamber of Deputies (Mexico) for Baja California Sur